Qasim Melho (born 5 February 1968 in Aleppo, Syria) is a Syrian television and theatre actor. He is also well known for his voice actor roles in several animation TV series.  He graduated from the Higher Institute of Dramatic Arts in 1993.

References
 Soofee TV
 Star Syria
  موقع الفنانين السوريون

1968 births
Living people
People from Aleppo
Syrian male television actors
Syrian male voice actors
Higher Institute of Dramatic Arts (Damascus) alumni